Kristin Bair O'Keeffe is an American novelist.

Born in 1966 in Pittsburgh, Pennsylvania, she graduated from Bethel Park High School. She earned a Bachelor of Arts from the Indiana University and a Master of Fine Arts from the Columbia College Chicago.

References

 Contemporary Authors Online. The Gale Group, 2009.

External links
Author website
Novel website

1966 births
Living people
21st-century American novelists
American women novelists
Writers from Pittsburgh
21st-century American women writers
Novelists from Pennsylvania